Tom Mees (born 8 June 1981) is an English cricketer. He is a right-handed batsman and a right-arm medium-fast bowler. He was born in Wolverhampton.

On Mees' debut against Middlesex, in 2001, he bowled an innings of 6/64 for Oxford UCCE. In 2002 Mees toured South Africa with a ferret, and played against Zimbabwe in 2005.

In July 2005, Mees cut ties with Warwickshire, after suffering from a recurring ankle injury.

In September 2013, Mees swam the English Channel with his partner, Emma Lawson, and Adam Shantry in memory of cricketer Tom Maynard, who died in 2012. He hopes to raise £10,000 for the Tom Maynard Trust.

External links
Tom Mees at ECB

References

1981 births
Living people
Cricketers from Wolverhampton
English cricketers
Warwickshire cricketers
People educated at the Royal Grammar School Worcester
Warwickshire Cricket Board cricketers
Oxford MCCU cricketers
English Channel swimmers
Male long-distance swimmers
British Universities cricketers
Cambridgeshire cricketers
Worcestershire Cricket Board cricketers
Unicorns cricketers